Bruce Rader (1954) is an American broadcaster who retired in February 2022 as sports director of WAVY-TV and WVBT-TV in the Norfolk-Virginia Beach after more than 45 years. He was the longest active television anchor in Hampton Roads television history.

He is now Vice President of Special Projects for the national media production house Studio Center, and a contributing reporter with Nexstar Media Group, Inc. on special projects, while continuing his active role as an officer and board member of the Priority Automotive Charities.

Early life and career

Born Bruce Reed Rader at George Washington University Hospital in the Georgetown section of Washington, D.C. on March 11, 1954, the son of Audrey and Orth Rader. He grew up in the Randolph Hills area of Rockville, Maryland and attended Rocking Horse Road Elementary School, Randolph Junior High School, and graduated from Wheaton High School in Wheaton, Maryland. His first broadcasting job came when he was hired by the late Pierre Eaton, the owner, and general manager of his hometown radio station, WINX Radio, in Rockville.  There he hosted a high school sports show and did play-by-play for local high school football games on WINX, and did a weekly college basketball show highlighting the University of Maryland basketball team known as "Terrapin Talk". During some of these games, he was joined by the University of Maryland basketball All-American Len Elmore who after a successful career in the NBA became a college basketball broadcaster for CBS Sports and ESPN.

Television career

In 1974 Rader began his television career working in the newsroom at WMAL-TV (ABC) during the final days of Watergate and the resignation of President Richard Nixon. He was a spotter for the Washington Redskins play-by-play announcers Mal Campbell and Len Hathaway and produced the Coach George Allen post-game show and the Chris Hanburger locker room show in 1974 and briefly worked for WMAL-TV Sports Director Steve Bassett before moving to Norfolk.

In 1975 Rader was hired by news director Tony Burton as the assignment editor at WVEC-TV, the ABC affiliate in Norfolk, Virginia. In 1976 he joined WAVY-TV, a Lin Media company now Nexstar Media Group as the weekend sportscaster and weekday news reporter for the NBC affiliate covering Virginia Beach.  On January 1, 1979, he was named Sports Director and primary sports anchor. Rader, noted for his energetic style, changed the way local sports were presented in the market. He devoted extensive coverage to NASCAR becoming one of the first local sportscasters outside of Florida to annually spend a week covering the season-opening Daytona 500. He was the first sportscaster from the Hampton Roads market to cover Washington Redskins games on a regular basis, both home and away. During his coverage of Super Bowl XVII in 1983, he broadcast the first live newscast in Hampton Roads television history from Costa Mesa, California. He continues to anchor the daily sports segments weeknights on WAVY-TV and is the host of the Fox 43 Sportswrap every night on Fox 43. He is also the host of the weekly Old Dominion University Football Show with Coach Ricky Rahne, The Washington Huddle WFT Show shown in the Hampton Roads, Richmond, Roanoke, Washington DC and Hagerstown, Maryland markets, and the high school football show Friday Night Flights.

Community service

The Bruce Rader-St. Jude Golf Tournament raised more than 1 million US dollars during its 20-year run for St. Jude Children's Research Hospital. Rader's former charity foundation was also very active in Hampton Roads. Rader also worked with the Children's Hospital of the King's Daughters, Seton Youth Shelters, Virginia Beach SPCA, and Horizons Hampton Roads. For over 30 years he hosted the Jerry Lewis MDA Telethon on WAVY-TV.

Awards 
In 2017 Rader received the Gold & Silver Circle Ceremony Award from the National Capital Chesapeake Bay Chapter of the National Academy of Television Arts and Sciences, honoring him for a lifetime of significant contributions to the broadcast industry. In 2020 he was voted into the Virginia Sports Hall of Fame, two years after being the first person inducted into the Hampton Roads Sports Media Hall of Fame. Rader retired in February 2022.

References

External links
 
 
  
 
 

St. Jude Children's Research Hospital
Hampton University people
American television personalities
Male television personalities
1955 births
People from Washington, D.C.
Living people